James Waldo Ackerman (January 1, 1926 – November 23, 1984) was a United States district judge of the United States District Court for the Southern District of Illinois and the United States District Court for the Central District of Illinois.

Education and career

Born in Jacksonville, Florida, Ackerman received a Bachelor of Science degree from Marquette University in 1947 and a Juris Doctor from Marquette University Law School in 1949. He served in the United States Navy, from 1944 to 1946 and again from 1952 to 1954. In the interim, he was in private practice of law in Sangamon County, Illinois. He was an assistant state's attorney for Sangamon County from 1954 to 1956, and then state's attorney in that county until 1960, when he returned to private practice. While in private practice, he was counsel to the municipal corporation of Springfield, Illinois from 1961 to 1962, assistant state treasurer for Illinois from 1963 to 1964, and deputy state attorney general from 1968 to 1971. He was a judge of the Illinois Circuit Court from 1971 to 1976.

Federal judicial service

Ackerman was nominated by President Gerald Ford on June 18, 1976, to a seat on the United States District Court for the Southern District of Illinois vacated by Judge Harlington Wood Jr. He was confirmed by the United States Senate on July 2, 1976, and received his commission on July 2, 1976. His service terminated on March 31, 1979, due to reassignment by operation of law to a new seat on the United States District Court for the Central District of Illinois created by 93 Stat. 6. He served as Chief Judge of the Central District from 1982 to 1984. His service terminated on November 23, 1984, due to his death in Springfield.

References

Sources
 

1926 births
1984 deaths
Illinois state court judges
Judges of the United States District Court for the Southern District of Illinois
Judges of the United States District Court for the Central District of Illinois
Marquette University alumni
Marquette University Law School alumni
People from Jacksonville, Florida
People from Sangamon County, Illinois
United States district court judges appointed by Gerald Ford
20th-century American judges
20th-century American lawyers
United States Navy personnel of World War II